The 3rd Golden Rooster Award honoring the best in film of 1983, was given in Fuzhou, Fujian Province, May 27, 1983.

Winners and nominees

References

External links 
 The 3rd Golden Rooster Award

1983
Golden Rooster Awards
Golden Rooster Awards
Golden Rooster Awards, 3rd
Golden Rooster Awards